Chondropoma (ex-Diplopoma) is a genus of operculate land snails, terrestrial gastropod molluscs gastropod in the family Pomatiidae.

Species
Species within the genus Chondropoma include:
 Chondropoma crenulatum (Potiez & Michaud, 1835)
 Chondropoma sp. is known from Dominica

References

Pomatiidae
Gastropod genera